Charles William Oakes   (30 November 1861 – 2 July 1928) was an Australian politician.

Early life
Oakes was born in Wagga Wagga, New South Wales, to Agnes Jane  Revelle and James Richard Oakes, a storekeeper. He was educated at state schools in Sydney, after which he became a jeweller and watchmaker. He was involved in local politics as a member of Paddington Council. He married Elizabeth Gregory on 1 September 1885.

Political career
In 1901, he was elected to the New South Wales Legislative Assembly as a Liberal Reform candidate for Paddington, and was re-elected in 1904 and 1907. He was appointed a minister without portfolio in the Wade ministry in 1907 until 1910, when he was one of three ministers defeated at the election.

In 1913, he was elected to the Australian Senate as a Commonwealth Liberal Party Senator from New South Wales, he was not re-elected in the double dissolution election the following year.

Oakes returned to state politics and the Legislative Assembly, winning Waverley as a Nationalist in 1917, serving again as a minister without portfolio from 1919. He was elected as one of five members for Eastern Suburbs in 1920. He was Colonial Secretary and Minister for Public Health in the 7 hour Fuller ministry in 1921, and then served in the positions again in the second Fuller ministry from 1922 until 1925. He did not contest the 1925 election, having accepted an appointment to the Legislative Council, where he served until his death.

Death

Honours
He was appointed a Companion of the Order of St Michael and St George (CMG) on 3 June 1922.

References

 

1861 births
1928 deaths
Australian jewellers
Free Trade Party politicians
Commonwealth Liberal Party members of the Parliament of Australia
Members of the Australian Senate
Members of the Australian Senate for New South Wales
Members of the New South Wales Legislative Assembly
Members of the New South Wales Legislative Council
Nationalist Party of Australia members of the Parliament of New South Wales
Australian Companions of the Order of St Michael and St George
20th-century Australian politicians